KRAW (90.7 FM) is a Pacifica Radio-affiliated talk radio station.  KRAW is licensed to Kasilof, Alaska by the Alaska Educational Radio System (AERS).

The station broadcasts a wide spectrum of pre-recorded and live streamed programs from the Pacifica Radio network and affiliated stations, as well as live programs from local contributors.  Additional live and pre-recorded programming is garnered from a variety of local and international broadcasters including KEUL Girdwood, WILL Urbana, Illinois, and others.

It also downloads and broadcasts programs from a wide variety of internet sources and podcasts including Blast the Right, Other Minds radio, Joe Frank, The Black Coffee Channel and acksisofevil.org.

Service area
KRAW itself covers the North and Central Kenai Peninsula. KRAW provides service to additional communities and areas through the following translator:

K300BY, 107.9 MHz, Palmer/Wasilla

AERS plans to simulcast KRAW by Fall 2008 over new full service FM facilities in several additional Alaskan communities including Fairbanks, Homer and Seward.

References

External links
KRAW Program Schedule

WMD
Radio stations established in 1973
1973 establishments in Alaska
Defunct radio stations in the United States
Radio stations disestablished in 2013
2013 disestablishments in Alaska
WMD